A thermal power station is a power station in which heat energy is converted to electric power. A thermal power station may be referred to as any of the following types:

 List of biomass power stations
 List of coal power stations
 List of fuel oil power stations
 List of geothermal power stations
 List of natural gas power stations
 List of nuclear power stations
 List of solar thermal power stations

See also 
 List of thermal power station failures